The Free Public Library Service (FPLS) was one of two state library agencies in Vermont. It was created in 1894 through an act of the State Legislature. The act mandated the creation of a state board of library commissioners, who would offer advice to  existing free public libraries. The commission would also offer $100 for towns without libraries to purchase books to start a library, provided they set it up with a trained board of trustees.

FPLS ran a series of regional libraries, maintained a union catalog, and provided for bookmobile and interlibrary loan services in the state between 1894 and 1970. It also oversaw the Dorothy Canfield Fisher Children's Book Award and provided library services to individuals with print disabilities. It merged with the State Library to become the Department of Libraries on March 31, 1970.

Bookmobile service
FPLS began Vermont's first "book-wagon" service in 1922 funded by the state Federation of Women's Clubs. It delivered book and other materials to small libraries, and loaned materials directly to individuals in towns without libraries. By 1940, FPLS has developed regional library services and divided the state into four regions, each with its own bookwagon funded by the Federation of Women's Clubs. In 1957 as a result of funding received through the new federal Library Services Act, FPLS purchased two larger type bookwagons that could hold materials and patrons. In 1970, FPLS merged with the State Library to create the Department of Libraries. The State Board of Libraries decided to discontinue state-operated bookmobile service  in 1974.

FPLS Executive Secretaries

References

Libraries in Vermont